Vitis mustangensis, commonly known as the mustang grape, is a species of grape that is native to the southern United States. Its range includes parts of Mississippi, Alabama, Louisiana, Texas, and Oklahoma.

Description
This woody species produces small clusters of hard green fruit that ripen into soft  dark purple berries between July –September.

They have a thick outer layer of flesh and on average contain four heart-shaped seeds. This variety of grape is recognized by the leaves that have a white velvet-like underside and lobed, cordate shape. These vines often cover trees, shrubs, fences and other objects that it grows near.

V. mustangensis is dioecious, with only female vines bearing fruit.

Culinary use
The fruit can be potentially irritating to the skin when handled, and are mildly unpleasant to eat raw because of bitterness and a high acidity content.

This grape has a list of culinary use as jelly, pie-filling, wine and grape juice, all of which are typically processed with heat and sweetened with sugar. 

Mustang grapes have been used to make mustang wine since before the Civil War.

The fruit and leaves of Mustang Grapes may also be used to dye wool.

References

External links
 
 
 Agie-horticulture.edu, Texas Native Shrubs — Vitis mustangensis (Mustang Grape)
 Natives of Texas.com: Mustang Grape (Vitis mustangensis) 
 UTexas.edu: Image archive of Vitis mustangensis (Mustang Grape)
Flora of North America: Vitis mustangensis
Plants of the World Online: Vitis mustangensis

mustangensis
Endemic flora of the United States
Flora of Alabama
Flora of Louisiana
Flora of Mississippi
Flora of Oklahoma
Flora of Texas
Plants described in 1862
Flora of Northeastern Mexico
Dioecious plants